Scott Stuckey (born March 23, 1964) is an American filmmaker and record producer from Washington, D.C. Stuckey is best known as the creator of the cult TV show Pancake Mountain, as well as his work with singer-songwriter Vic Chesnutt.

Career
Stuckey was born in Eastman, Georgia, United States. His mother was an English teacher and father, W. S. Stuckey Jr., a Congressman from Georgia’s 8th district. His grandfather started Stuckey's, a chain of restaurants on the highway. The family moved to D.C. in 1966. In high school he was placed in a small creative school where he met like-minded people and discovered D.C.'s fledgling punk scene. He recalled how important this was in a Time Magazine profile: “[t]he DC scene and Dischord (records) showed me that music could be created outside of traditional systems. There were no record companies or lawyers, just a bunch of teenage kids pressing vinyl in a basement, it was beautiful”. For the next few years he taught himself filmmaking.

In 1984, he moved to New York City, where he became friends with musician Ned Ebn and photographer Chris Makos. Both would heavily influence his passion for combining sound and motion images.

In 1989, he began recording bands at his home studio in Athens, Ga. where he worked on projects with R.E.M. and Vic Chesnutt. Chesnutt recorded four albums there including 1991’s West of Rome. Stuckey and Chesnutt became close friends and worked on dozens of film and music projects that continued up until Chesnutt’s suicide in 2009. At the time of Chesnutt’s death he and Stuckey were working on a film and a rap album. Neither have been released.

While working on an R.E.M video with director Jem Cohen in the early 1990s Stuckey began to move back to filmmaking. He would go on to direct music videos and documentaries for Thievery Corporation, Widespread Panic, Vic Chesnutt, Bob Mould, Minor Threat, Garbage, and others.

Through Pancake Mountain he has directed and worked with artists such as Katy Perry, The White Stripes, M.I.A., and Eddie Vedder. As a songwriter Stuckey has written original songs for the show. Many of the contacts he made as a producer/engineer became early guests on Pancake Mountain.

Work with Pancake Mountain

Pancake Mountain was created by Stuckey as an homage to local TV as well as his fondness for DIY community-based art movements like DC's Dischord Records Scene and The Factory.

In 2003 Stuckey created Pancake Mountain, a music based children’s show that paid homage to local 1960s and 1970s programing. He also credits the DIY community-based art movements like DC's Dischord Records Scene and Warhol’s Factory [4] as inspirations. Stuckey met Warhol through mutual friend Christopher Makos, and became fascinated by Warhol’s experimental films  “I’d always wanted to make a kids show the way Warhol or Fellini might have approached it, more like an art project then typical programming”.

His friendship and work with Dischord founder, Ian Mackaye led to Ian's group, The Evens, writing a song for the first episode of Pancake Mountain. The song, "Vowel Movements", was controversial in the punk scene, as Mackaye had never embraced music videos or lip-syncing. Despite initial trepidation from the punk community the song was well received and helped launch the show to a greater audience.

The show has been credited as influencing a whole new genre of kid-based television, most notably the show Yo Gabba Gabba!, which began airing three years after "Pancake Mountain".

In 2009 he found an unlikely fan in producer/director J. J. Abrams who wanted to produce the show.  Abrams and Stuckey spent two years pitching the show, but every network either passed or wanted to make changes that Stuckey and Abrams were not willing to make.

In February 2012, Stuckey and Abrams decided to stop pitching the show. The last skit was with Garbage's Shirley Manson and talking dogs.

On February 28, 2012, the Pancake Mountain website put up an announcement that the show was ending until a network would give them full creative control.

Production halted until April 2014, when The New York Times reported that PBS was going to bring Pancake Mountain back as part of their PBS Digital Studios with Stuckey having full creative control.

The first episode premiered on June 9, 2014. and is expected to end in September 2016.

Critical response
He was named a pioneer of children’s television by Time magazine and the show was listed as one of the 10 best of 2007 by the Los Angeles Times.

CNN's Chuck Roberts credited Stuckey with creating a new genre for television.

Inspiration
The Rufus Leaking character (puppet) is loosely based on Ignatius Riley, the protagonist from A Confederacy of Dunces by John Kennedy Toole.

Stuckey took the name Rufus Leaking from Widespread Panic's Dave Schools, who used the name as his alias when checking into hotels.

References

External links
CNN Interview
Time Magazine Profile
Pancake Mountain

1964 births
Living people
People from Eastman, Georgia
American filmmakers
Record producers from Georgia (U.S. state)